Gyuhap chongseo (roughly translated as "Women's Encyclopedia") is a compendium of advice for women, written by Yi Bingheogak in 1809 during the Korean Joseon Dynasty.

Composition
 Jusaui : making jang (condiments), alcoholic beverages, bap (rice dish), tteok (rice cake), yugwa (fried puffed rice snack), banchan (small dishes) and among others.
 Bongimchik : making clothing, a process of dyeing, weaving, embroidery, sericulture, soldering dishware, lightening.
 Sangarak : farming, gardening, raising livestock
 Cheongnanggyeol : taegyo, methods of childrearing, knowledge of first aid and medicine to be avoided
 Sulsuryak : knowledge of choosing a house, talismans, folkloric ways to drive away evil spirits.

See also
Siui jeonseo
Sallim gyeongje
Sarye pyeollam

References

Korean encyclopedias
Joseon dynasty works
1809 non-fiction books
19th-century encyclopedias